White Hall is a historic site on the campus of Bethune-Cookman University in Daytona Beach, Florida, United States. It is located at 640 Mary McLeod Bethune Boulevard (formerly 2nd Avenue). On July 15, 1992, it was added to the U.S. National Register of Historic Places.

History 
White Hall is named after Thomas H. White, founder of the White Sewing Machine Company. Mr. White met Mary McLeod Bethune while vacationing in Florida. He became a trustee of the school (then known as the Daytona Educational and Industrial Training School) and financial supporter.  White Hall was built in 1915 with classroom and office spaces. It closed in 2010 for renovations, and it reopened and was rededicated in August 2012. White Hall houses Bethune-Cookman University's president's suite and administrative offices.

Gallery

References

External links
 Volusia County listings at National Register of Historic Places
 Mary McLeod Bethune Home and White Hall at National Register Travel Itineraries
 Florida's Office of Cultural and Historical Programs
 Volusia County listings
 White Hall - Bethune-Cookman College

National Register of Historic Places in Volusia County, Florida
Buildings and structures in Daytona Beach, Florida